Chico Viola Não Morreu is a 1955 Argentine film directed by Román Viñoly Barreto.

Cast
  Alexandre Amorim		
  Paulo Gilvan Bezerril
  Blecaute		
  Wilza Carla		
  eArnóbio Carvalho		
  Inalda de Carvalho		
  Jacy de Oliveira		
  Sérgio de Oliveira		
  Moacyr Deriquém		
  Cleonir dos Santos		
  Cyl Farney	 ...	Francisco Alves
  Edson França
  Geny França		
  Wilson Grey		
  Heloísa Helena		
  Joe Lester		
  Vera Lúcia Magalhães		
  Laís Maria	
  Avany Maura		
  José Melo		
  Tupiara Molina		
  Paulo Montel		
  Francisco moreno		
  João Costa Neto
  D'Andréa Netto		
  Domingos Pereira		
  João Péricles		
  Walter Quinteiro		
  Maria Luiza Raposo		
  Ruy Rey		
  Frederico Schlee
  Túlio Varga		
  Derek Wheatley		
  Eva Wilma

External links
 

1955 films
1950s Spanish-language films
Argentine black-and-white films
Films directed by Román Viñoly Barreto
Argentine drama films
1955 drama films
1950s Argentine films